The Großache is a river,  long, in the east of the Austrian state of Tyrol and the Bavarian region of Chiemgau.

Names
The river is known by four different names, each applying to a different section of its course: above Kitzbühel it is the Jochberger Ache, from Kitzbühel to St. Johann in Tyrol it is known as the Kitzbüheler Ache, in its middle reaches as the Großache, a name also used for the entire Austrian section, and in its lower reaches in Germany as the Tiroler Achen. It rises on the Thurn Pass on the territory of Salzburg state, reaches the Tyrolean border after just  and the German border after , discharging  later near Grabenstätt into the Chiemsee lake.

The Großache is not the only river whose name changes at the border of two countries that share the same language. The term  is not a plural form, but a peculiarity of the Bavarian dialect. The name  is also used.

Sources 
On the official Austrian 1:200,000 scale map, the highest part of the river is shown as the Trattenbach, which is longer and also delivers greater quantities of water than the nominal headstream of the river.

Course 
A few of its early tributaries are, however, larger and have a greater discharge.

The valleys of the Jochberger Ache and Kitzbüheler Ache are surrounded by the Kitzbühel Alps.
The Großache forms the eastern boundary of the Kaiser Mountains.
Between Kössen, which lies in an east-west valley opening onto the Inn trench and also known as Kaiserwinkl, and the Bavarian valley near Schleching the river pierces the Chiemgau Alps in a narrow gorge, the Entenloch. Near Grassau the Tiroler Achen reaches the Alpine Foreland.

The Tiroler Achen finally discharges  into the lake of Chiemsee and, thence via the river Alz, belongs to the right-hand river system of the Inn, and the Danube, whose waters eventually reach the Black Sea.

Water works and conservation 
Increasing settlement in the Leuken and Achen valleys, the lower valleys of the Ache, since the 1960s led to heavy pollution of the Tiroler Achen, and hence the Chiemsee, with sewage. In the 1970s its water quality was assessed as 'critical'. Only by providing the settlements along the river with proper sewage systems and building modern sewage farms, e.g. in Kössen and Grassau (Achen Valley Sewage Works), could pollution of the river be significantly reduced.

The area of the river delta where it discharges into the Chiemsee is designated as a nature reserve.

From 1996-2001 the Großache was renaturalised in the area of Kirchdorf in Tirol as part of the Kirchdorf flood protection project. This was achieved by deepening the river bed and widening the banks to produce greater drainage volume. In the flood plain a  area was set aside for flood retention. In addition to flood protection, this innovative strategy has along brought additional benefits in the shape of nature conservation and human recreation.

External links 
 Tiroler Ache 
 Achen Valley Sewage Association

References 

Rivers of Bavaria
Rivers of Tyrol (state)
Kitzbühel District
Rivers of Austria
Rivers of Germany
International rivers of Europe